"I'm a Ding Dong Daddy from Dumas" is a song written and sung by Phil Baxter, accompanied by Phil Harris and his orchestra in 1928. It was originally named after the town of Dumas, Texas. The radio station KDDD-FM in Dumas is named after the song, hence the three D's stand for Ding Dong Daddy.

The song is performed by actor Bill Heath in the series finale of the Comedy Central show Nathan for You in an attempt to convince a group of locals that he is authentically from Dumas, Arkansas.

Other Versions 
 The Osmond Brothers
 Bob Wills
 Arthur Godfrey
 Louis Armstrong
 Benny Goodman
 George Melly
 Nick Shoulders
 Robert Earl Keen
 Larry Hooper
 Bill Heath (Nathan for You)

References

1928 songs
Songs about Texas
Songs about fictional male characters
The Osmonds songs
Louis Armstrong songs
Benny Goodman songs
Bob Wills songs